Liz Grant FRCPEdin, MFPH is an Assistant Principal and Director of the Global Health Academy at the University of Edinburgh She is a researcher and educator in the areas of palliative care compassion and global health and is a Fellow of the Royal Society of Edinburgh and  the Royal College of Physicians in Edinburgh and holds a chair in Global Health and Development.

International role 
Grant sits on the Scottish Government NHS Global Citizenship Board which approves strategies and plans that support the policies and priorities set by the Scottish Government's International Development Strategy. She was on the Board of Directors for the Consortium of Universities for Global Health, (CUGH)  and currently chairs the CUGH Research Committee.

Education and research 
Grant has a MA Religious Studies from University of Aberdeen and a PhD from University of Edinburgh. She has worked  as part of Scottish initiatives in Malawi, Kenya and  Zambia including working with Mhoira Leng, FRSE.  She has been an advisor to global health charities and global health communities of practice.

References 

Academics of the University of Edinburgh
Living people
Fellows of the Royal Society of Edinburgh
Alumni of the University of Aberdeen
Alumni of the University of Edinburgh
Scottish women academics
Public health researchers
Year of birth missing (living people)